Chaglla District is one of four districts of the province Pachitea in Peru.

Populated centers
In the district there are 22 towns, one of which is urban and the 21 remaining rural.

Urban towns
Chaglla (2604 pop.)

Rural towns
Chunatahua (332 pop.)
San Miguel (155 pop.)
Chinchavito (460. hab)
Puerto Guadalupe (266 pop.)
Santa Rita Baja (364 pop.)
Santa Rita Alta (274 pop.)
Santa Rita Sur (222 pop.)
Pampamarca (240 pop.)
Miraflores (243 pop.)
Andahuaylas (178 pop.)
Pasto (186 pop.)
Palmamonte (166 pop.)
Chinchopampa (198 pop.)
Chihuanhuay (161 pop.)
Agua Blanca (175 pop.)
Illatingo (210 pop.)
San Cristóbal de Naunán (156 pop.)
Quishuar (161 pop.)
Yanano (252 pop.)
Montevideo (319 pop.)
Pueblo Libre (198 pop.)

Disperse population
People living in communities with fewer than 151 people joined 3542.

References